"Bop Bop Baby" is a song by Irish boy band Westlife and it was released on 20 May 2002 as the third and final single from their third studio album, World of Our Own (2001). The single peaked at number five on the UK Singles Chart; during an interview, the band claimed this was due to the obscure choice of single, as they would have much preferred to release "Why Do I Love You", for which they had recorded a video. It is the band's 18th-best-selling single in paid-for sales and in combined sales in the United Kingdom as of January 2019. Billboard named the single one of the "Top 15 Underrated Boy Band Jams" in 2015.

Background
The song was written by band members Brian McFadden and Shane Filan alongside Graham Murphy and Chris O'Brien. This is their first song co-written by the band members that was released as a single. McFadden said that he got inspired to wrote the lyrics after watching a Beach Boys documentary. It was composed in the traditional verse–chorus form in D major, with McFadden, Filan and Mark Feehily's vocal ranging from the chords of G3 to A5.

Music video

The video for "Bop Bop Baby" was initially to be directed by Vaughn Arnell and was to feature the band in front of the Irish skyline. Instead, the video was directed by Max & Dania. The video was supposed to have Naomi Campbell as the leading lady, but she cancelled her participation at the last minute, and Leah Wood took over. The video was filmed at the University of Hertfordshire and took 32 hours to film. There were 25 extras on set, seven stuntmen, two horses, and Janty Yates (the costume designer for Russell Crowe's box office smash Gladiator).

The video is set during the Medieval times. At the start of the video it is said that a beautiful maiden wished to marry for love, but her father wants her to marry Duke Vincent (Vinnie Jones), the vilest man in the kingdom for money. The band members serve as Musketeers who are imprisoned in a dungeon by the Duke. McFadden attempts to approach a nearby prisoner but is scared off. The five members then break free, riding on horses, they arrive at the wedding and battle the Duke's men. At one point, Kian Egan and Feehily nearly slash each other, screaming in the process before they got attacked by the Duke. The band members then attack the Duke before fleeing the church with the maiden with the Duke in pursuit. Billboard called the video "unintentionally hilarious" as well as a "riotous masterpiece".

Track listings

UK CD1
 "Bop Bop Baby" (single remix)
 "You Don't Know"
 "Imaginary Diva" (Orphans remix)
 "Bop Bop Baby" (CD ROM video)

UK CD2
 "Bop Bop Baby" (single remix)
 "Bop Bop Baby" (Almighty radio edit)
 Band interviews (CD ROM)

UK cassette single
 "Bop Bop Baby" (single remix)
 "You Don't Know"
 "Imaginary Diva" (Orphans remix)

European CD single
 "Bop Bop Baby"
 "You Don't Know"

Australian CD single
 "Bop Bop Baby" (single remix)
 "Bop Bop Baby" (Almighty radio edit)
 "Bad Girls"
 Video excerpts and band interviews

Credits and personnel
Credits are lifted from the Unbreakable – The Greatest Hits Volume 1 album booklet.

Studios
 Engineered at Rokstone Studios (London, England), Windmill Lane (Dublin, Ireland), and Olympic Studios (London, England)
 Mastered at Transfermation (London, England)

Personnel

 Brian McFadden – writing
 Shane Filan – writing
 Graham Murphy – writing
 Chris O'Brien – writing
 Paul Gendler – guitars
 Steve Pearce – bass
 Dave Arch – Hammond organ
 Steve Mac – keyboards, production, arrangement, mixing
 Chris Laws – drums, engineering, Pro Tools engineering
 Matt Howe – mix engineering
 Daniel Pursey – assistant engineering
 Quentin Guiné – assistant engineering
 Lee McCutcheon – Pro Tools engineering
 Richard Dowling – mastering

Charts

Weekly charts

Year-end charts

Release history

References

External links
 

2000s ballads
2002 singles
Bertelsmann Music Group singles
Music videos directed by Max & Dania
RCA Records singles
Shane Filan songs
Song recordings produced by Steve Mac
Songs written by Brian McFadden
Songs written by Shane Filan
Syco Music singles
Westlife songs